Kwon Soon-woo defeated Roberto Bautista Agut in the final, 6–4, 3–6, 7–6(7–4) to win the men's singles tennis title at the 2023 Adelaide International 2. It was his second ATP Tour singles title, and he became just the tenth man in ATP Tour history to win a title as a lucky loser.

Thanasi Kokkinakis was the defending champion, but lost in the semifinals to Bautista Agut.

Seeds
The top four seeds received a bye into the second round.

Draw

Finals

Top half

Bottom half

Qualifying

Seeds

Qualifiers

Lucky losers

Qualifying draw

First qualifier

Second qualifier

Third qualifier

Fourth qualifier

References

External links
Main draw
Qualifying draw

Adelaide International 2 - Singles
2023 Singles 2
Adelaide